Châteaubriant is a town in western France.

Châteaubriant or Chateaubriant may also refer to:

Places
 Château de Châteaubriant, a castle in France
 Arrondissement of Châteaubriant, an arrondissement in France

People
 Françoise de Foix, Comtesse de Châteaubriant (1495-1537) mistress to Francis I, King of France
 Alphonse de Châteaubriant (1877-1951) French writer

Other uses
 Chateaubriand steak
 Edict of Châteaubriant (1551)

See also
 Chateaubriand (disambiguation)